Rokne is a surname. Notable people with the surname include:

Jon George Rokne, Canadian engineer
Marianne Rokne (born 1978), Norwegian handballer

Norwegian-language surnames